Robert or Bob Leahy may refer to:
 Robert L. Leahy, psychologist and author
 Bob Leahy (American football), American football player and coach
 Bob Leahy (broadcaster), New Zealand radio and television broadcaster

See also
 Robert Leahy Fair, United States Army general